Santa Eugenia is an administrative neighborhood (barrio) of Madrid belonging to the district of Villa de Vallecas. As of 1 March 2020, it has a population of 24,782. The Hospital Universitario Infanta Leonor is located in the neighborhood.

References 

Wards of Madrid
Villa de Vallecas